Candidimonas humi is a Gram-negative bacterium from the genus Candidimonas which has been isolated from sewage sludge in Portugal.

References 

 

Burkholderiales
Bacteria described in 2011